Günay (also: Güneyköy) is a village in the Sivrice District of Elazığ Province in Turkey. The village is populated by Turks. Its population is 64 (2021).

References

Villages in Sivrice District